Mohamed Jilani Maaref (born 27 October 1991) is a Tunisian handball player for Club Africain and the Tunisian national team.

He participated on the Tunisia men's national handball team at the 2016 Summer Olympics in Rio de Janeiro, in the men's handball tournament.

References

1991 births
Living people
Tunisian male handball players
Olympic handball players of Tunisia
Handball players at the 2016 Summer Olympics